Dendrobium junceum is a species of the family Orchidaceae. The plant is native to Borneo and the Philippines.

Characteristics 
Dendrobium junceum is a sympodial orchid which forms pseudobulbs. When the life cycle of the mother plant ends it produces little offsets, continuing the life of the plant. The same cycle is used every year. The stem is erect and during the flowering period start from mid-January till late may it forms blooms on its sides with one to two 3.75 cm wide flowers. This monocot has thin, white roots and leads an epiphytic type of life.

References

External links 
 
 The Internet Orchid Species Photo Encyclopedia at orchidspecies.com 

junceum
Orchids of Borneo
Orchids of the Philippines
Epiphytic orchids